Paul-Marcel Dammann (13 June 1885, Montgeron, Paris, France – 1939, Montgeron) was a French engraver and medalist, a student of Jules-Clément Chaplain (1839–1909).

Second second Grand Prix de Rome for medal engraving in 1905.

Prix de Rome in 1908, second medal in 1914, first medal in 1921, Medal of Honor in 1925.

Some of his works are kept at the Musée de la Monnaie de Paris and the American Numismatic Society Museum in New York.

Bibliography 
 E. Bénézit, Dictionnaire des peintres, sculpteurs, dessinateurs et graveurs, 1976. Tome 3, page 340.

External links 
 Biography
 Deux Etude de femme pour "Aux morts la Patrie reconnaissante"
 Paul-Marcel Damman, sculpteur et médialleur on Société d'Histoire Locale de Montgeron
 Paul-Marcel Dammann on Princeton University Art Museum

References

French engravers
20th-century engravers
Prix de Rome for engraving
People from Essonne
1885 births
1939 deaths